The Bronnant Fault is a geological fault affecting the lower Palaeozoic rocks of the counties of Ceredigion and Pembrokeshire in West Wales. The feature is mapped over part of its length as the Bronnant Fault Zone and is closely associated with the Glandyfi Lineament, a similarly aligned zone of faulting and folding. The rocks of the Aberystwyth Grits Group dating from the Llandovery epoch of the Silurian period thicken markedly to the west of the fault suggesting it was active at the time of their deposition. North of Lledrod its alignment is affected by cross-cutting east–west faults, including the Ystwyth Fault Zone. Its alignment is sub-parallel to the coast of Cardigan Bay thus curving from a north–south alignment in the north through a northeast–southwest alignment until it merges with broadly east–west aligned faults in northeast Pembrokeshire.

See also
List of geological faults of Wales

References

Geology of Wales